BXE or bxe may refer to:

 BXE, the IATA code for Bakel Airport, Senegal
 bxe, the ISO 639-3 code for Ongota language, Ethiopia